Damon Kyle Wayans Sr. (born September 4, 1960) is an American actor, comedian, producer, and writer. Wayans performed as a comedian and actor throughout the 1980s, including a year long stint on the sketch comedy series Saturday Night Live.

His true breakthrough, however, came as writer and performer on FOX's sketch comedy show In Living Color (1990-1992), on his animated series Waynehead (1996-1997) and on his TV series Damon (1998). Since then, he has starred in a number of films and television shows, some of which he has co-produced or co-written, including Beverly Hills Cop, The Last Boy Scout, and Major Payne and the sitcom My Wife and Kids. From 2016 to 2019, he starred as Roger Murtaugh in the television series Lethal Weapon. He is a member of the Wayans family of entertainers.

Early life 
Wayans was born in Harlem in New York City, the son of Elvira Alethia (Green), a homemaker, singer and social worker, and Howell Stouten Wayans, a supermarket manager. He has five sisters—Elvira, Vonnie, Nadia, Kim and Diedra—and four brothers—Keenen, Marlon, Shawn and Dwayne. He was club footed as a child.

This attribute would also be given to his character in My Wife and Kids, and his character on the short lived cartoon series Waynehead. Wayans attended Murry Bergtraum High School.

Career 
Damon started doing stand-up comedy in 1982. His earliest film appearance was a brief cameo as an effeminate hotel employee in the Eddie Murphy film of 1984, Beverly Hills Cop. From 1985 to 1986, he appeared on Saturday Night Live as a featured performer, before getting fired after just eleven episodes for improvising during a live sketch, playing his character as a flamboyant gay cop instead of a straight cop. (Damon continued this sketch character in his family created show In Living Color on Fox Television, in 1990, as the flamboyant gay character, Blaine Edwards, an obvious hat tip to Blake Edwards of movies starring The Pink Panther.) Wayans later claimed that he wanted to be fired due to lack of creative freedom and screen time. Wayans further explained that Lorne Michaels did not want Wayans to do too much too soon and begin drawing comparisons to Eddie Murphy who had just left the show. He also appeared in the syndicated television series Solid Gold during the 1980s as a comedian.

With his brother Keenen, Wayans created the Fox sketch comedy series In Living Color, which had a mostly African-American cast. The show went on the air in April 1990. It continued running until May 1994, although Wayans left the show in 1992 to pursue a film career.

After In Living Color, he starred in films such as Mo' Money, The Last Boy Scout, Major Payne, Celtic Pride, Bulletproof, and The Great White Hype, and wrote and starred in the film Blankman. He also appeared in Janet Jackson's video "The Best Things in Life Are Free" and was considered for the role of The Riddler in Batman Forever (the role went to Jim Carrey, his co star from In Living Color and Earth Girls Are Easy).

In October 1996, he produced Waynehead, a short lived cartoon for The WB, loosely based on his own childhood growing up in a large family, starring a poor boy with a club foot. The show only lasted a season due to poor ratings. From 1997 to 1998, he was the executive producer of 413 Hope St., a short lived drama on the FOX network starring Richard Roundtree and Jesse L. Martin.

In March 1998, he starred in the short lived comedy television series Damon, in which he played a detective from Chicago. It aired on Fox. In 1999, his The New York Times bestselling book Bootleg, with co author David Asbery was published; it is a humorous compilation of his observations about family.

In October 2000, he was the lead in Spike Lee's Bamboozled. Wayans starred in the ABC comedy series My Wife and Kids from March 2001 to May 2005. In the end of 2006, he produced and starred in the Showtime sketch comedy series The Underground, which also featured his son, Damon Jr. He also hosted the June 2006 BET Awards.

In 2011, he also added author of a serious fictional novel to his credits with "Red Hats" which is the story of a suicidal sixty five-year-old woman who finds friendship and happiness, when she joins the Red Hat Society. , Wayans continues to perform stand-up comedy and has developed apps with his company of freelancers "MIMS" (Money in My Sleep). The company created applications such as Flick Dat, Diddeo and VHedz.

On November 12, 2015, at the Irvine Improv, Damon Wayans announced his retirement from stand up commencing December 2015. In September 2016, he was cast as Roger Murtaugh in the television version of Lethal Weapon, a role originated by Danny Glover in the film series. On October 3, 2018, it was reported that Wayans would leave Lethal Weapon after filming of the first thirteen episodes of Season 3 wrapped. Lethal Weapon officially ended in February 2019, after three seasons.

Damon Wayans is returning with a new project at ABC and is reteaming with My Wife and Kids co-creator Don Reo on the new family comedy, Let's Stay Together (working title). The project, now in development, will be produced by ABC Studios, a division of Disney TV Studios.

Awards and honors 
Wayans received four Emmy awards nominations for his acting and writing in In Living Color.

For his role in My Wife and Kids, he won the 2002 People's Choice Awards for Favorite Male Performer in a New TV Series, and received four International Press Academy "Golden Satellite Award" nominations.

Personal life 
Wayans was married to Lisa Thorner; they divorced in 2000. He has four children with Thorner: sons Damon Wayans Jr. and Michael Wayans and daughters Cara Mia Wayans and Kyla Wayans. He is also a grandfather. He is the uncle of Damien Dante Wayans, Chaunté Wayans and Craig Wayans.

Wayans is a close personal friend of both NBA legend Michael Jordan and fellow In Living Color star Jim Carrey.

Wayans was diagnosed with Type 2 diabetes in January 2013.

In September 2015, Wayans defended American comedian Bill Cosby from his sexual assault accusations, stating, "It's a money hustle". He continued, saying, "Forty years – listen, how big is his penis that it gives you amnesia for 40 years? If you listen to them talk, they go, 'Well, the first time...' The first time? Bitch, how many times did it happen? Just listen to what they're saying and some of them really is unrape-able. I look at them and go, 'You don't want that. Get outta here.

In Living Color

Characters 

Whiz (Homeboy Shopping Network)
Homey D. Clown
Blaine Edwards (Men on...)
Handi-Man
Reverend Ed Cash
Anton Jackson
Head Detective
Tom Brothers (w/Keenen Ivory Wayans)
Oswald Bates

Impressions 
 Babyface (on Saturday Night Live)
 Don King (on In Living Color)
 Little Richard (on Saturday Night Live and In Living Color)
 Louis Farrakhan (on both Saturday Night Live and In Living Color)
 Redd Foxx (on In Living Color)
 Richard Pryor (on In Living Color)
 Fab Morvan (on In Living Color)
 Jamie Foxx (on In Living Color)
 Roland Gift (on In Living Color)

Filmography

Film

Television

Documentary

References

External links 

Twit.tv's Triangulation Episode 175 Damon Wayans

1960 births
Male actors from New York City
American male film actors
African-American stand-up comedians
American stand-up comedians
American male screenwriters
African-American television producers
Television producers from New York City
American television writers
American people of Malagasy descent
Living people
Damon
African-American male actors
American male television actors
American male voice actors
20th-century American male actors
21st-century American male actors
American sketch comedians
American male television writers
African-American film directors
Comedians from New York City
20th-century American comedians
21st-century American comedians
Screenwriters from New York (state)
Film producers from New York (state)
People from Chelsea, Manhattan
Murry Bergtraum High School alumni
20th-century African-American people
21st-century African-American people
American Jehovah's Witnesses